The Atlantic Coast Conference Baseball Player of the Year is a baseball award given to the Atlantic Coast Conference's most outstanding player. The award was first given following the 1969 season, with both pitchers and position players eligible. After the 2005 season, the Atlantic Coast Conference Baseball Pitcher of the Year award was created to honor the most outstanding pitcher.

Key

Winners

Winners by school
Note that because NCAA baseball is a spring sport, the year of joining the ACC is the calendar year before the first season of competition.

Footnotes
 The University of Maryland left the ACC in 2014 to join the Big Ten Conference.

References

NCAA Division I baseball conference players of the year
Player